The 1934 Boston Red Sox season was the 34th season in the franchise's Major League Baseball history. The Red Sox finished fourth in the American League (AL) with a record of 76 wins and 76 losses, 24 games behind the Detroit Tigers.

On January 5, 1934, during renovation work at Fenway Park—including the removal of Duffy's Cliff, an embankment in front of the Green Monster—a fire that started at the ballpark caused significant damage and spread to some nearby buildings on Lansdowne Street. Further repair and renovation work, costing over $1 million, was completed in time for Opening Day.

Offseason 
 December 12, 1933: Bob Kline, Rabbit Warstler, and $125,000 were traded by the Red Sox to the Philadelphia Athletics for Lefty Grove, Max Bishop and Rube Walberg.

Regular season

Season standings

Record vs. opponents

Opening Day lineup

Roster

Player stats

Batting

Starters by position 
Note: Pos = Position; G = Games played; AB = At bats; H = Hits; Avg. = Batting average; HR = Home runs; RBI = Runs batted in

Other batters 
Note: G = Games played; AB = At bats; H = Hits; Avg. = Batting average; HR = Home runs; RBI = Runs batted in

Pitching

Starting pitchers 
Note: G = Games pitched; IP = Innings pitched; W = Wins; L = Losses; ERA = Earned run average; SO = Strikeouts

Other pitchers 
Note: G = Games pitched; IP = Innings pitched; W = Wins; L = Losses; ERA = Earned run average; SO = Strikeouts

Relief pitchers 
Note: G = Games pitched; W = Wins; L = Losses; SV = Saves; ERA = Earned run average; SO = Strikeouts

Farm system 

Columbia franchise transferred and renamed, June 7, 1934

References

External links 
1934 Boston Red Sox team page at Baseball Reference
1934 Boston Red Sox season at baseball-almanac.com

Boston Red Sox seasons
Boston Red Sox
Boston Red Sox
1930s in Boston